Three ships of the Estonian Navy have been named Wambola:

 , an  acquired in 1919 and sold to Peru in 1933.
 , a  acquired in 2000 and decommissioned in 2009.
 , a  acquired by Estonia in 2006 as the training ship Kriistina, but handed over to the Estonian Navy in 2009 and renamed Wambola. 

Ship names